Bradyrhizobium stylosanthis is a nitrogen-fixing bacterium from the genus Bradyrhizobium which has been isolated from the nodules of the plant Stylosanthes guianensis.

References

External links
Type strain of Bradyrhizobium stylosanthis at BacDive -  the Bacterial Diversity Metadatabase

Nitrobacteraceae
Bacteria described in 2016